Konarak-e Bala (also Romanized as Konarak-e Bālā, Kanārak-e Bālā, and Konrok Bālā; also known as Konarak-e ‘Olyā) is a village in Gandoman Rural District of Gandoman District, Borujen County, Chaharmahal and Bakhtiari province, Iran. At the 2006 census, its population was 934 in 227 households. The following census in 2011 counted 1,007 people in 286 households. The latest census in 2016 showed a population of 1,058 people in 299 households; it was the largest village in its rural district. The village is populated by Lurs.

References 

Borujen County

Populated places in Chaharmahal and Bakhtiari Province

Populated places in Borujen County

Luri settlements in Chaharmahal and Bakhtiari Province